Be Mine Tonight may refer to:

Be Mine Tonight (film), a 1932 film directed by Anatole Litvak and starring Jan Kiepura 
Be Mine Tonight, a 2003 album by Dean Roberts
"Be Mine Tonight" (Th' Dudes song), 1979
"Be Mine Tonight" (Neil Diamond song) 1982
"Be Mine Tonight", a song by Blackmore's Night from the 1997 album Shadow of the Moon